Mavroudis (Makis) Voridis (born 23 August 1964) is a Greek politician and lawyer. His previous and current involvement with far-right rhetoric and past association with dictator Georgios Papadopoulos has made him a controversial figure in Greek politics.

A member of the Hellenic Parliament for New Democracy since 2012, he currently serves as the Minister for the Interior in the Cabinet of Kyriakos Mitsotakis. He previously served as Minister for Infrastructure, Transport and Networks in the Cabinet of Lucas Papademos (2011–2012), Minister for Health in the Cabinet of Antonis Samaras (2014–2015), and Minister for Rural Development and Food in the original Mitsotakis cabinet (2019–2021).

Early life and education 

Voridis graduated from Athens College and acquired his degree from the Law School of the University of Athens. He also acquired a Master of Laws with merit from University College London. Voridis specialized in international commercial law, criminal law, and the philosophy of law. During his time there, he was the leader of the fascist student group "Student Alternative". Voridis himself has denied any connection with far-right politics, instead describing himself as a national liberal.

Political career 

After graduating from Athens College, he was appointed secretary general of the young wing of the National Political Union (EPEN), a far-right political party founded by a year earlier by the jailed leader of the 1967 military coup and junta leader Georgios Papadopoulos. Voridis, who replaced Nikolaos Michaloliakos (who went on to lead Golden Dawn) as EPEN's youth leader, remained in this position until 1990.

During his compulsory military service from 1992 to 1993, Voridis graduated class leader (92 A' ESSO) in Armour School and he served as an Armour Cadet Reserve Officer, gaining the rank of second lieutenant.

In 1994, he founded the far-right Hellenic Front party and became its first president. He unsuccessfully ran for the position of Athens mayor in 1998 and 2002. The Front's motto was "Red Card to the Illegal Immigrants", and he ran together with Konstantinos Plevris in the national elections of 2000. The Hellenic Front under the chairmanship of Voridis performed lamentably in the 2004 general election and managed to gather only 7000 (0.1%) votes. As a result of this, the Hellenic Front ceased its political activity in 2005 and was subsequently merged with the more successful Popular Orthodox Rally (LAOS) party. Voridis became a member of the political council of LAOS. Voridis later competed for a council seat in the 2006 local elections on the LAOS ticket in East Attica. He eventually secured 5% of the vote and was elected prefectural councillor.

Parliamentary career 

On 16 September 2007, Makis Voridis was elected Member of the Greek Parliament with LAOS, calling up 8,663 votes in the Attica district, with a potential difference of 5174 votes from the second candidate, Tania Iakovidou, a TV journalist. 

In November 2011, Voridis was appointed Minister for Infrastructure, Transport and Networks in the coalition government headed by Lucas Papademos. In February 2012, he was expelled from LAOS for supporting the second bailout package but retained his portfolio after consultations with the prime minister. A few days later, he joined New Democracy and surrendered his parliamentary seat to LAOS. As Minister, Voridis was supposed to open up professions like taxi drivers, a measure he has previously opposed on multiple occasions.

On 10 June 2014, Voridis was appointed Minister for Health,  despite significant concern from Jewish and other groups.

On 9 July 2019, he was appointed Minister for Rural Development and Food in the cabinet of New Democracy leader and prime minister Kyriakos Mitsotakis. On 5 January 2021, he was appointed Minister for the Interior.

Controversy 

According to a former fellow student at Athens College, writing in Israeli newspaper Haaretz, Voridis formed the fascist student group "Free Pupils" that painted the walls with swastikas and saluted each other using the Nazi-era greeting "Heil Hitler." It was further alleged that during school elections, Voridis would violently threaten the Jewish students who opposed his fascist group, as well as their families.

In an interview with The Guardian, Voridis denied allegations of crypto-fascism, antisemitism and homophobia, describing himself as a national liberal with a rightwing student activist background. Voridis has also expressed views against illegal immigration. The article's author describes him as a former "axe-wielding fascist" who "does not deny he is a reconstructed fascist". His presence in government has been met with alarm by Jewish and leftist groups.

References

External links

 
Hellenic Lines, newspaper of the Hellenic Front party (in Greek)
 
Kathimerini daily newspaper, an article about Makis Voridis and the parliamentary group of the Popular Orthodox Rally (in English)
Article by The Guardian about the extreme right in Europe. Makis Voridis is mentioned.

|-

|-

|-

1964 births
Greek nationalists
National liberalism
Government ministers of Greece
Agriculture ministers of Greece
Health ministers of Greece
Ministers of the Interior of Greece
Greek MPs 2007–2009
Greek MPs 2009–2012
Greek MPs 2012 (May)
Greek MPs 2012–2014
Greek MPs 2015 (February–August)
Greek MPs 2015–2019
Greek MPs 2019–2023
New Democracy (Greece) politicians
Popular Orthodox Rally politicians
Politicians from Athens
National and Kapodistrian University of Athens alumni
Alumni of University College London
Living people